An electrolytic process is the use of electrolysis industrially to refine metals or compounds at a high purity and low cost.  Some examples are the Hall-Héroult process used for aluminium, or the production of hydrogen from water. Electrolysis is usually done in bulk using hundreds of sheets of metal connected to an electric power source. In the production of copper, these pure sheets of copper are used as starter material for the cathodes, and are then lowered into a solution such as copper sulphate with the large anodes that are cast from impure (97% pure) copper. The copper from the anodes is electroplated on to the cathodes, while any impurities settle to the bottom of the tank. This forms cathodes of 99.999% pure copper.

See also
Electrolysis of water

References

Industrial processes
Chemical processes
Hydrogen production
Articles containing video clips